Vladimir Kuzmich Gusev (19 April 1932 – 29 August 2022) was a Russian and Soviet politician.

Biography 
Vladimir Gusev was born on 19 April 1932, in Saratov. In 1957, he graduated from the chemical faculty of the Saratov State University as a chemist-technologist. From 1959 to 1975 he worked at the Engels chemical fiber plant, reaching the post of its director. In 1975 Gusev became first secretary of the Engels city committee of the CPSU and in fact head of the city. The next year he was appointed first secretary of the Saratov regional Party committee, a position he held to 1985.

In 1985–86, Gusev was the first deputy premier of the Soviet Russia in the cabinet of Vitaly Vorotnikov. Until the end of 1990 he was deputy premier of the USSR, Chairman of the bureau for the chemical industry and forestry. In 1986, he took part in the liquidation of the consequences of the Chernobyl disaster as chairman of the state commission.

In December 1993, he was elected to the 1st State Duma by the Liberal Democratic Party list. He was the chairman of the Committee for industry, construction, transport and energy. From 2001 to 2010, Gusev represented Ivanovo Oblast in the Federation Council. From 2010 to 2012, he was senator from his home region, Saratov Oblast. Doctor of Technical Sciences.

Awards 
  Order "For Merit to the Fatherland" 4th class
  Order of Lenin (1971, 1982)
  Order of the October Revolution (1976)
  Order of the Badge of Honour (1965)
  Order of Courage (1996)

References 

1932 births
2022 deaths
20th-century Russian politicians
21st-century Russian politicians
Politicians  from Saratov
Soviet politicians
Communist Party of the Soviet Union members
Central Committee of the Communist Party of the Soviet Union members
Eleventh convocation members of the Soviet of the Union
Seventh convocation members of the Supreme Soviet of the Soviet Union
Tenth convocation members of the Supreme Soviet of the Soviet Union
Members of the Supreme Soviet of the Russian Soviet Federative Socialist Republic, 1975–1980
Liberal Democratic Party of Russia politicians
First convocation members of the State Duma (Russian Federation)
Second convocation members of the State Duma (Russian Federation)
Members of the Federation Council of Russia (after 2000)
Recipients of the Order of Lenin
Recipients of the Order "For Merit to the Fatherland", 4th class
Recipients of the Order of Courage
Deaths from the COVID-19 pandemic in Russia